The Southern Caribbean'' is a group of islands that neighbor mainland South America in the West Indies. Saint Lucia lies to the north of the region, Barbados in the east, Trinidad and Tobago at its southernmost point, and Aruba at the most westerly section.

Physical geography of the region
The Southern Caribbean has the Caribbean to the north and west, the Atlantic Ocean on the east, and the Gulf of Paria to the south. Most of the islands are in the Windward Islands and the Leeward Antilles.

Geologically, the islands are referred to as being a sub-continent of North America, although most islands sit on the South American continental plate. All of the Southern Caribbean islands are small, and are either volcanic or made of limestone coral, as they form at the ridge of the Caribbean and South American tectonic plates.

The majority of the islands are covered in tropical rainforests and swamps; the densest of these are in Grenada, Saint Lucia, and Tobago. Various other islands' rainforests have decreased in size over the last century due to deforestation.

Due to the close proximity of the equator, the Southern Caribbean has all-year-round tropical weather. Islands such as Aruba and Barbados occasionally suffer droughts, while Grenada receives a great deal of rainfall.  Dry seasons in Aruba and Barbados may occur even while Grenada is receiving rain.

Countries

 Associates
  Colombia
    Guyana
 Venezuela

 History 
The Caribbean had been inhabited for about 7000 years by the Arawaks, Island Caribs, Taínos and their ancestors, who came to the Southern Caribbean on canoes from South America (primarily Venezuela). In the late 15th and early 16th centuries, European explorers and colonizers arrived. The Europeans replaced virtually the entire population of the native tribes through various means. The natives disappeared due to various reasons, including diseases brought in by Europeans to which they had no immunity, warring, enslavement and the removal of the natural resources upon which these tribes depended. European countries then made the Caribbean islands part of their respective empires. Most of these islands were disputed and fought over by European empires, such as Britain, France, the Netherlands, Portugal, and Spain:

 Britain claimed: Trinidad and Tobago, Grenada, Barbados, Saint Vincent and the Grenadines, and Saint Lucia.
 France claimed: Saint Lucia, Grenada, Saint Vincent and the Grenadines, and Trinidad and Tobago (briefly).
 The Netherlands claimed: Aruba, Bonaire, and Curaçao.
 Portugal claimed: Barbados.
 Spain claimed:  Aruba, Bonaire, Curaçao.Trinidad and Tobago, and Grenada (briefly).

Eventually, all of the islands in the region except the Dutch islands Aruba and Netherlands Antilles were occupied by the British, who were in control from the 18th century onwards. The various islands declared their independence during the 1960s. The Dutch Caribbean islands are still part of the Netherlands and none have yet declared full independence. Trinidad & Tobago was the first nation in the Southern Caribbean to become independent in 1962, followed by Barbados in 1966. All of the islands (except the Dutch Antilles) were part of the West Indies Federation from 1958 until its dissolution in 1962.

 Culture 
Like other Caribbean nations, the Southern Caribbean island states share similar cultures. Cricket is widely enjoyed in the region and rum is the local drink. African traditions are primarily influential on these islands, particularly in Grenada and St Lucia and Indian Traditions in Trinidad and Tobago and Guyana. Influences from the European cultures are heavily based in Barbados and the former Netherlands Antilles. Other than English, the main language, French creole, Portuguese creole, Dutch, Spanish, and Papiamento are also spoken in the region, as well as Hindi.

Demographics
The Southern Caribbean is very diverse, with over 70% of its population of Afro-Caribbean descent, who originated from West Africa and were brought to the Caribbean as slaves to work on plantations. Indo-Caribbeans originally from India and Bangladesh are primarily in Trinidad, although large numbers can also be found in Barbados and Saint Vincent, many more live on the other islands too. Chinese arrived in the region as laborers from Hong Kong, and are found on most islands. Europeans are found all over the West Indies due to the colonization of the region by countries such as France, the Netherlands, Portugal, Spain, and the United Kingdom. French Creoles may be found inhabiting the islands of Saint Lucia, Trinidad and Grenada; while Portuguese people make up a sizable group of Barbados' European population - numbering over 2,000 - third in size to the English and Irish people on the island. Spanish people settled on Trinidad and still have small numbers of descendants, while the Dutch people have a strong influence on the ABC islands. Neighbouring South America has had a massive influence on the ethnic diversity of the Southern Caribbean. Many Brazilian mulattoes and Brazilian Jews went to Barbados, where their descendants still live. Many Venezuelans arrive in Trinidad, Barbados, and Aruba each year, and many Puerto Ricans and Dominican people migrate to the Southern Caribbean along with many Guyanese. In addition, the area receives a lot of expatriates from the US, Canada, and Europe.

Music
Each island has its own musical flair and individuality, but musically soca is the most dominant of the English-speaking islands in the region. Invented in Trinidad, the closest islands, Barbados and Grenada, were the first islands to promote and produce music out of Trinidad & Tobago. Since the 1960s, many other islands have been promoting their styles of music, such as Antigua & Barbuda, St Kitts & Nevis, Saint Vincent, Dominica, and Jamaica (although to a much lesser extent). The steel pan, a famous symbol of the Caribbean, was invented in Trinidad also during the 1940s, during World War II. Many oil drums from the USA had been transported to Trinidad, and there, an inspired musician molded the base in order to make a drum. It now is a universally recognized symbol of Trinidad and Tobago and the West Indies.

Island musicBarbados - Soca-Samba: A fusion of Brazilian Samba and Soca music. Samba was introduced to Barbados by Afro-Brazilians. The music had never really been produced by Bajan artists until 1999 when Square One released "Faluma", spoken in the language of the Saamaka tribe in Suriname, a song featuring the Soca-Samba bass. Rupee had also produced "Jump", which had a soca-samba essence (although some argue it is pure soca). Barbados also produced Rihanna, one of the Caribbean's more famous international artists, as well as Rupert Clarke (Rupee) and Alison Hinds.Grenada - Grenadian Calypso: Derived from neighboring Trinidad & Tobago, Grenadian music uses many African drums in their music, such as the "Big Drum", which arrived in Grenada when enslaved Africa were brought to the island by British and French colonizers. Carriacou has similar music to that of the French West Indies. Boula music is a type of music made using hand drums from old rum casks.St Lucia - Soca and calypso music are St Lucia's main types of music, just as in Trinidad and the Eastern Caribbean islands. St Lucia also holds a jazz festival; many U.S. artists perform there. St Lucia is the number one island to produce zouk music featuring the French accordion with various percussion instruments.Trinidad & Tobago''' - Soca: A fusion of soul and its predecessor calypso given the name soul-calypso (or shortened as soca). Used in traditional carnivals, its features are a quick tempo with bass, hi-hat, bongo, and tassa drums, just as are used in Soca, as well as guitars. Trinidad's famous steel-pan music is made from oil drums and is also used in carnivals. Trinidad has contributed artists such as Machel Montano, Destra Garcia, Calypso Rose, Nicki Minaj and David Rudder.

Sport
Cricket is the major sport in the Southern Caribbean. Barbados is a hub for cricket fans and sportsmen, with legendary Sir Garfield Sobers and Clyde Walcott hailing from the island. Brian Lara from Trinidad is also a key player in the West Indies cricket team. In 2007, the West Indies region hosted the Cricket World Cup 2007. Apart from Antigua and Barbuda, Jamaica, and Saint Kitts and Nevis, all other matches were played in the Southern Caribbean in Queen's Park Oval,  Trinidad, Beausejour Stadium, Saint Lucia, Queen's Park, Grenada, and the final was held at the Kensington Oval (28,000 seats) in Barbados.

Football (or called soccer in the USA) is the second major sport in the area, after Trinidad and Tobago was the first team in the Southern Caribbean (and third in the Caribbean after Haiti and Jamaica), to qualify for the World Cup. They were the Caribbean favorites in the 1974 World Cup Qualifiers but lost out to Haiti under questionable officiating. Again coming close to qualifying for the 1990 World Cup, the "Soca Warriors fell by a single goal to the always powerful USA team despite only needing a draw to qualify.  The "Soca Warriors" were knocked out in the group stages as they competed in Group B along with England, Sweden, and Paraguay, at the 2006 World Cup in Germany. Trinidad and Tobago are still the smallest nation to ever qualify for the World Cup in soccer.

Netball, hockey, and volleyball are also competitive sports in the region, although are not as widely recognized as are cricket and soccer. Golf is a sport that is mainly based in Barbados' Sandy Lane resort, which hosted the World Golf Championships-World Cup in 2006. Tennis and badminton are on the steady increase in Barbados and Trinidad & Tobago, but they occasionally send national teams to the Commonwealth Games. Athletics is a well established category of sport in the Southern Caribbean in both the Olympics and the Commonwealth games. Sprinters hailing from the Southern Caribbean include Obadele Thompson of Barbados, who won Bronze at a 100m sprint at the Sydney Olympic Games; Ato Boldon of Trinidad & Tobago, who won Silver at the 100m sprint at the Sydney Olympic Games; Marc Burns of Trinidad & Tobago, who won Bronze at the Melbourne Commonwealth Games; Trinidad's 1976 Montreal Olympics Gold Medallist Hasely Crawford; and Grenada's Alleyne Francique, who ran the 400m sprint and won the silver medal at the Melbourne Commonwealth Games (2006). During the 2008 Beijing Olympics, Trinidad and Tobago earned a silver medal in the 4 × 100 m men's relay, coming second to fellow West Indian island, Jamaica.

Diaspora of the Southern Caribbean
There are over two million people involved in the Southern Caribbean diaspora. Grenada has more expatriates than any other island in the region, and with most leaving the island for the United Kingdom, Canada, and the US, although some migrate to nearer countries such as Trinidad and Saint Vincent. Trinidad has a growing diaspora to Canada, mostly to Toronto, that has contributed the Toronto Caribana in the city. The Trinidadian diaspora is only second in size to the Jamaican diaspora in Canada from the Caribbean. Grenada and Guyana are two nations whose populations are migrating elsewhere, as the two countries are some of the least developed countries in the Americas. Many Guyanese have chosen the nearby island of Barbados, and many people on the island have Guyanese relatives or relations. Other than that, the Guyanese have settled in England (mostly London) and Canada, similar to Vincentians and St Lucians. Barbados has the least migration as it's developing a successful economy, and the living conditions are better than in some other Southern Caribbean countries. However, after World War II, many Barbadians moved to the USA (South Carolina, Virginia, and New York), Canada, and primarily the UK. It has a smaller diaspora compared to its neighboring islands, however.  Arubans most often migrate to the Netherlands or the US, but a small portion migrates to Canada or Venezuela. Many black British and mixed race people have Southern Caribbean heritage, and a few possess dual heritage of two Caribbean nations. Mostly with Jamaica, (Jamaican/Trinidadian), (Jamaican/Bajan), (Jamaican/Grenadian), and to a lesser extent, a mixture of the Southern nations, (Bajan/Guyanese), (Trini/Grenadian), and (Trini/Bajan). In the United Kingdom, parts of Canada, and the US, Caribbean independence days are held in cities and are celebrated by people of Caribbean descent.

Jamaica vs "The Smallies"
In the US, Canada, and the UK, the non-Anglophone Caribbean community is mixed with many from the Anglophone Caribbean community. Some cases of segregation have arisen among West Indian people, however, which causes a commonly found rivalry between people from the larger island of Jamaica and those from the smaller "Smallie" islands of the Southern Caribbean. From the 1960s to the 1980s, many Jamaicans would not associate with someone from Trinidad/Barbados/Grenada, and vice versa. Tensions between the regions originate from the days of slavery, as both regions blame each other for "selling them out" to Europeans. During the 1960s-1980s, this racial tension reached a high point as many Caribbean people were discouraged from intermingling with those from other nations. They were even encouraged to marry only their "own people", that is, Jamaican man with a Jamaican woman, Trinidadian man with a Trinidadian woman and so forth.

However, it was not frowned upon for a Southern Caribbean person to marry another Southern Caribbean person (Trinidadian man with a Barbadian woman), as they classed themselves the same (unlike the Jamaicans). Jamaicans coined the term "Smallie" (meaning "small Islander") as a derogatory word used for Trinidadians, Barbadians, Grenadians, Vincentians, and St Lucians, as well as Kittians and Antiguans. For people who were not Jamaican, the Jamaican use of the term "Smallies" helped create a stereotype of Jamaicans being sneaky, common, and violent. This rift was well known in London until the Brixton Riots united the black Caribbean population, which now has a growing number of bi-national Caribbean descendants. Friendlier rivalry now occurs, such as the soca vs. reggae rivalry, which recently escalated between Jamaica's I Wayne and Trinidad's Bunji Garlin, after I Wayne labeled soca "Devil music". Other than that, the two regions challenge each other to who can "wuk up" the best.

See also
ABC islands
Caribbean South America
Lesser Antilles
Spanish Main
Western Caribbean zone

References

External links
 Fun Facts: Southern Caribbean

Caribbean
Geography of the Caribbean
Regions of the Caribbean
Geography of Aruba
Geography of Barbados
Geography of Bonaire
Geography of Grenada
Geography of Curaçao
Geography of Saint Lucia
Geography of Saint Vincent and the Grenadines
Geography of Trinidad and Tobago
Geography of South America